Dangeh-ye Khodayar (also Romanized as Dangeh-ye Khodāyār) is a village in Qalkhani Rural District, Gahvareh District, Dalahu County, Kermanshah Province, Iran. At the 2006 census, its population was 55, in 10 families.

References 

Populated places in Dalahu County